Per Lukas Daniel Bonnier (16 June 1922 – 8 February 2006) was a Swedish publisher. He was a member of the Bonnier family, the son of Tor Bonnier.

Bonnier was president of Åhlen & Åkerlunds tidskriftsförlag from 1957–1978 and 1980–1982. He then became chairman of the board of Bonniers Tidskriftsförlag. In 1989, he succeeded his brother Albert as chairman of Bonnierföretagen.

Lukas Bonnier obtained the rights to produce a comic book in Sweden, based on the comic The Phantom, and was a personal friend of The Phantom’s creator, Lee Falk. The Swedish comic book began in 1950 and is, as of 2006, still being published.

References

1922 births
2006 deaths
Swedish Jews
Swedish speculative fiction publishers (people)
Lukas
Swedish Army officers
20th-century Swedish businesspeople